Raman (English: Travelogue of Invasion) is a 2008 Malayalam film written and directed by Dr. Biju. A controversial and much debated-over socio-political film, it shows two variants of invasion by imperialist forces—of Iraq and Kerala. The film was an official selection for eight international film festivals including the prestigious Cairo International Film Festival.

According to the director, the film "shows how economic, cultural and military invasion by the U.S. ends up annihilating third-world countries like India and Iraq." George W. Bush has been described as a "political terrorist" in the film.

Plot
Raman tells the story of Raman (Anoop Chandran), a village tea-shop assistant in Kerala and Diya Raman (Avantika Akerkar), wife of the US Defence Secretary. A media activist, she is trying to make a documentary about the adverse impact of American imperialism, worldwide. The film has two parallel tracks, one set in India shows how globalisation creates economic and cultural imbalances in developing nations, the other is about the US's violent invasion of Iraq.

Cast
 Anoop Chandran as Raman
 Avantika Akerkar
 Thazhava Sahadeven
 Seenath
 S. Saji
 Chayansarkar

Production

Release
The film had its world premiere on 30 November 2008 at the STEPS International Film Festival. The film had a limited theatrical release in Kerala on 16 January 2009. It was released at a theatre each in Kozhikode, Thrissur and Thiruvananthapuram.

The film was shown at at least 8 international film festivals including the following.

 November 2008: STEPS International Film Festival – "Kiev" Cinema section
 December 2008: 7th Chennai International Film Festival
 November 2009: 33rd Cairo International Film Festival – "Incredible India" section
 December 2009: 14th International Film Festival of Kerala

References

2008 films
2000s Malayalam-language films
2008 drama films
Films about terrorism in India
Films directed by Dr. Biju
Films shot in Kerala
Films shot in Rajasthan